Kadalkkaattu is a Malayalam film of 1977 directed by P. G. Viswambharan and produced by Sherif Kottarakkara. The film stars Jayabharathi, K. P. A. C. Lalitha, M. G Soman  and Bahadoor in the lead roles. The film has musical score by A. T. Ummer.

Cast
Jayabharathi as Lisy
KPAC Lalitha as Mariya
Jose Prakash as Vasu chettambi 
Bahadoor aa Saidukka
Janardanan as Gopalan
Kottarakkara Sreedharan Nair as Fernandez
M. G. Soman as Sreedharan
Kollam GK Pillai as Sankaran
Kuthiravattom Pappu as Raghavan
Santhakumari as Stella

Soundtrack
The music was composed by A. T. Ummer and the lyrics were written by Bichu Thirumala.

References

External links
 

1980 films
1980s Malayalam-language films
Films directed by P. G. Viswambharan